Fedotozine (INN; JO 1196 for the (-) tartrate salt) is an opioid drug of the arylacetamide series which acts as a peripherally specific selective κ1-opioid receptor agonist with preference for the κ1A subtype. It was under investigation for the treatment of gastrointestinal conditions like irritable bowel syndrome and functional dyspepsia and made it to phase III clinical trials, but ultimately development was discontinued and it was never marketed.

See also 
 Asimadoline
 Trimebutine

References 

Acetamides
Analgesics
Kappa-opioid receptor agonists
Opioids
Peripherally selective drugs
Abandoned drugs